The Pine Grove Covered Bridge is a covered bridge that spans the East Branch of Octoraro Creek on the border between Lancaster County and Chester County in Pennsylvania, United States. It is the longest covered bridge in Lancaster County. The bridge was built in 1884 by Elias McMellen.

Background
The bridge has a two-span, wooden, double Burr arch truss design with the addition of steel hanger rods. It is the only two-span covered bridge still in use. The bridge's deck is made from oak planks. It is painted red, the traditional color of Lancaster County covered bridges on the outside, but is not painted on the inside. Both approaches to the bridge are painted in the traditional white color.

The bridge's WGCB Number is 38-15-22/38-36-41. Added in 1980, it is listed on the National Register of Historic Places as structure number 80003521.  It is located at  (39.7935, -76.04433).

Nearby covered bridges

Gallery

See also
Burr arch truss
List of bridges documented by the Historic American Engineering Record in Pennsylvania
List of Lancaster County covered bridges

References

Bibliography

External links

Covered bridges in Chester County, Pennsylvania
Covered bridges in Lancaster County, Pennsylvania
Covered bridges on the National Register of Historic Places in Pennsylvania
Bridges completed in 1884
Historic American Engineering Record in Pennsylvania
National Register of Historic Places in Chester County, Pennsylvania
National Register of Historic Places in Lancaster County, Pennsylvania
Road bridges on the National Register of Historic Places in Pennsylvania
Wooden bridges in Pennsylvania
Burr Truss bridges in the United States